2019 United States World Cup team may refer to:
2019 United States FIBA Basketball World Cup team
United States women's national soccer team in the 2019 FIFA Women's World Cup